Mortal Kombat: Legacy is an American web series anthology that aired on Machinima.com's YouTube channel. The first episode was uploaded on April 11, 2011, with subsequent episodes uploaded each following week until the final episode, which premiered two months later at Comic Con 2011. The series was created by Kevin Tancharoen, based upon the Mortal Kombat video game series created by Ed Boon and John Tobias. Two seasons of the show have aired.

The show came about following the positive reaction from fans to a short film Tancharoen made with his own money entitled Mortal Kombat: Rebirth that took a small part of the franchise's story and told it in a real-world scenario without the supernatural elements common to the series. After submitting the film to Warner Bros., Tancharoen received the green light to produce the web series, written by himself and Spartacus writers Todd and Aaron Helbing, with Tancharoen directing.

The series is set before the events of the first game and tells the background stories of the characters who featured in its story, focusing on the relationship between each other, and revealing the reasons of some for attending the upcoming tenth Mortal Kombat tournament. There is little continuity between episodes, with some set ages before the first game, while others are set shortly before. Each episode is devoted to the story of a specific character or characters.

A total of nine episodes of Mortal Kombat: Legacy were produced for the first season, the last of which aired on July 24, 2011. At present, the videos are available online, and the entire first & second season are available on Blu-ray in all Regions.

List of seasons

Seasons

Season 1 (2011)
Season one aired from April 11, 2011 to July 24, 2011. The original airdates (U.S.) are listed here for each episode.

Season one begins with the conflict between Jax and Sonya of the Deacon City Police Department and Kano of the Black Dragon clan. Also explored are the ancient day Shirai Ryu and Lin Kuei clans, the modern day Lin Kuei Cyber Initiative, the rise and fall of Hollywood movie star Johnny Cage, a realistic interpretation of Raiden – the God of Thunder and Lightning, and the family of Emperor Shao Kahn in the realms of Outworld and Edenia. Season I demonstrates little continuity between each episode, other than the Cyrax and Sektor episode taking place shortly before the Jax, Sonya and Kano episodes, revealing that Kano provided the means and parts to construct the Lin Kuei's Cyber Initiative shortly before Jax and Sonya moved in on him.

Season 2: II (2013)
Filming for the second season concluded in December 2012. Ten episodes were filmed, with a trailer released at the Streamy Awards on February 17, 2013. All the episodes were released on September 26, 2013.

References
General
 Mortal Kombat: Legacy (2011-08-11) from Warner Home Video

Specific

External links
List of Mortal Kombat: Legacy episodes at the IMDb

Mortal Kombat Legacy